refers to the following railway stations in Japan:
Sumiyoshi Station (Hanshin) (:ja:住吉駅 (阪神)) in Higashinada-ku, Kobe on the Hanshin Electric Railway Main Line 
Sumiyoshi Station (JR West) (:ja:住吉駅 (JR西日本)) in Higashinada-ku, Kobe on the JR West Tokaido Main Line (JR Kobe Line) and the Kobe New Transit Rokko Island Line
Sumiyoshi Station (Kumamoto) (:ja:住吉駅 (熊本県)) in Uto, Kumamoto, on the JR Kyushu Misumi Line 
Sumiyoshi Station (Nagasaki) (:ja:住吉駅 (長崎県)) in Nagasaki on the Nagasaki Electric Tramway
Sumiyoshi Station (Osaka) (:ja:住吉駅 (大阪府)) in Sumiyoshi-ku, Osaka on the Hankai Tramway Hankai Line and Uemachi Line.
Sumiyoshi Station (Tokyo) (:ja:住吉駅 (東京都)) in Kōtō-ku, Tokyo on the Toei Shinjuku Line and the Tokyo Metro Hanzomon Line